The Raccoons and the Lost Star is the third of four animated television specials leading up to the animated television series The Raccoons and debuted on December 13, 1983. It came after the first two Raccoons seasonal specials, which were The Christmas Raccoons (1980) and The Raccoons on Ice (1981). There are some thematic elements that did not exist in the first two specials, such as the Raccoons' world being separate from that of the humans, but it is the first one to develop the look and feel of the series. In the United States, where The Raccoons specials were in the top 10 in Nielsen ratings, The Raccoons and the Lost Star was the number one children's two-part special in syndication at the time.

Plot
One night in the Evergreen Forest, Schaeffer the sheepdog is playing with his human owners, Tommy and Julie, when their father, Ranger Dan has a surprise for them. As Schaeffer takes a brief nap, he is awoken by a glowing red plane that lands in front of the cabin. Schaeffer goes to investigate, but the pilot gets a call from his commanding officer to return to his base. Panicking, Schaeffer climbs into the passenger seat of the plane and is flown away from Earth and to a strange jungle planet. Upon his arrival to a giant base filled with weaponry, he's chased by the forces of the Imperial Commander Cyril Sneer, but escapes them. Schaeffer runs into Sophia Tutu, a friend of his from the planet Earth, although Sophia doesn't seem to know Schaeffer. Sophia takes Schaeffer to meet Broo, her pet sheepdog puppy. Meanwhile, Cyril Sneer plans to conquer Earth with the help of a magic star (which Broo wears around his neck). The star has enough power to launch his firepower to raid the planet. He sends out his army to hunt down every animal in the jungle and find the star.

Meanwhile, Sophia, Broo, and Schaeffer are captured by the Raccoons (Ralph, Bert and Melissa). The trio are the only animals left in the jungle. They free Sophia, Broo and Schaeffer finding they are on their side. Sophia then meets up with her boyfriend Cedric Sneer and finds out that Cyril is Cedric's father. After a series of animals being rescued and recaptured, Cyril notices on a security tape that Broo has the star. That night, Cyril discovers a "jungle rendezvous" Cedric is having with Sophia and he follows him and has Sophia imprisoned and soon all her friends, but with Broo and Cedric's help, the Raccoons and the other animals escape from Cyril's clutches and destroy his fortress in the process.

After rejoice, Bert flies Schaeffer back to Earth via airplane. Schaeffer awakes from his long dream and sees that Ranger Dan, Tommy and Julie reveal their surprise to him, which turns out to be Broo.

Cast
 Len Carlson - Bert Raccoon / Pig General
 Michael Magee - Cyril Sneer / Snag
 Bob Dermer - Ralph Raccoon / Bears
 Dottie West - Melissa Raccoon
 Carl Banas - Schaeffer / Bears
 Fred Little - Cedric Sneer / Pig General
 Sharon Lewis - Sophia Tutu / Broo
 John Schneider/Kevin Gillis (2023 Remaster) - Dan the Forest Ranger
 Nick Nichols - Pig General
 Tammy Bourne - Julie
 Hadley Kay - Tommy
 Rich Little - Narrator

Songs and performers
 John Schneider - "Calling You", "Shining", "One More Night" (duet), "Friends" (duet)
 Dottie West - "Lions & Tigers", "Fallin', Fallin'"

Production
The Lost Star was inspired by the 1977 film Star Wars (now Star Wars: Episode IV - A New Hope). The special was originally meant to be a full-length feature, but was made into an hour-long special, due to a lack of funding.

Reception
Variety praised the third special, The Raccoons and the Lost Star, calling it "a rollicking good adventure filled with space-age animation, high-tech gadgetry, lilting tunes, a lovable sheepdog, and the delightful Raccoons team".

References

External links

 

1983 television films
1983 animated films
1983 television specials
1980s animated television specials
1983 films
Canadian animated television films
English-language Canadian films
Space adventure films
Films about raccoons
Films about dreams
The Raccoons
1980s Canadian films
Films set on fictional planets